David H. Shinn (born June 9, 1940) is an American diplomat and professor. He is an Adjunct Professor of International Affairs at The George Washington University's Elliott School of International Affairs. His diverse career in the foreign service of the United States has included ambassadorships to Ethiopia and Burkina Faso. Shinn is also a frequent commentator in the news media on political issues, and has provided consultancy to the U.S. government on Horn of Africa related matters as well as Sino-African relations.

Education
Shinn received his B.A. (1962), M.A. (1963), and Ph.D. (1980) from George Washington University. He also received a certificate in African Studies from Northwestern University and was diplomat-in-residence at University of California, Los Angeles and Southern University in Baton Rouge, Louisiana.

Government Service
Shinn served for 37 years in the United States Foreign Service with assignments at embassies in Lebanon, Kenya, Tanzania, Mauritania, Cameroon, Sudan, and as ambassador to Burkina Faso and Ethiopia.

Philanthropy
Shinn is active in several non-governmental organizations focused on the Horn of Africa and the African Great Lakes region. He serves on the board of directors for Adeso, an NGO founded by the Somali environmentalist Fatima Jibrell. It conducts programs in Somalia, Kenya and South Sudan. Additionally, Shinn is on the board of directors of the Phi Theta Kappa Foundation.

Awards
1995 – International Alumnus of the Year by Phi Theta Kappa, the community college scholastic honor society
1994 – National Alumnus of the Year, American Association of Community Colleges

Notes

External links
David Shinn bio provided by George Washington University
David Shinn blog
Profile of David Shinn  in GW Today

1940 births
Living people
Ambassadors of the United States to Ethiopia
Ambassadors of the United States to Burkina Faso
People from Yakima, Washington
George Washington University alumni
George Washington University faculty
United States Department of State officials
United States Foreign Service personnel